An aquatic animal is any animal, whether vertebrate or invertebrate, that lives in water for all or most of its lifetime. Many insects such as mosquitoes, mayflies, dragonflies and caddisflies have aquatic larvae, with winged adults. Aquatic animals may breathe air or extract oxygen from water through specialised organs called gills, or directly through the skin. Natural environments and the animals that live in them can be categorized as aquatic (water) or terrestrial (land). This designation is polyphyletic.

Description
The term aquatic can be applied to animals that live in either fresh water or salt water. However, the adjective marine is most commonly used for animals that live in saltwater, i.e. in oceans, seas, etc.

Aquatic animals (especially freshwater animals) are often of special concern to conservationists because of the fragility of their environments. Aquatic animals are subject to pressure from overfishing, destructive fishing, marine pollution, hunting, and climate change. Many habitats are at risk which puts aquatic animals at risk as well. Aquatic animals play an important role in the world. The biodiversity of aquatic animals provide food, energy, and even jobs.

Fresh water creates a hypotonic environment for aquatic organisms. This is problematic for some organisms with pervious skins or with gill membranes, whose cell membranes may burst if excess water is not excreted. Some protists accomplish this using contractile vacuoles, while freshwater fish excrete excess water via the kidney. Although most aquatic organisms have a limited ability to regulate their osmotic balance and therefore can only live within a narrow range of salinity, diadromous fish have the ability to migrate between fresh water and saline water bodies. During these migrations they undergo changes to adapt to the surroundings of the changed salinities; these processes are hormonally controlled. The European eel (Anguilla anguilla) uses the hormone prolactin, while in salmon (Salmo salar) the hormone cortisol plays a key role during this process.

Freshwater molluscs include freshwater snails and freshwater bivalves. Freshwater crustaceans include freshwater crabs and crayfish.

Air-breathing aquatic animal 
In addition to water breathing animals, e.g., fish, most mollusks etc., the term "aquatic animal" can be applied to air-breathing aquatic or sea mammals such as those in the orders Cetacea (whales) and Sirenia (sea cows), which cannot survive on land, as well as the pinnipeds (true seals, eared seals, and the walrus). The term "aquatic mammal" is also applied to four-footed mammals like the river otter (Lontra canadensis) and beavers (family Castoridae), although these are technically amphibious or semiaquatic. There are up to one million types of aquatic animals and aquatic species.

Amphibians, like frogs (the order Anura), while requiring water, are separated into their own environmental classification. The majority of amphibians (class Amphibia) have an aquatic larval stage, like a tadpole, but then live as terrestrial adults, and may return to the water to mate.

Certain fish also evolved to breathe air to survive oxygen-deprived water, such as Arapaima (family Osteoglossidae) and walking catfish.

Most mollusks have gills, while some fresh water ones have a lung instead (e.g. Planorbidae) and some amphibious ones have both (e.g. Ampullariidae). Many species of aquatic animals lack a backbone or are invertebrates.

Importance for environment 
Aquatic animals play an important role for the environment as well as human's daily usage. The importance of aquatic animals comes from the fact that they are organisms that provide humans with sources such as food, medicine, energy shelter, and raw materials that are used for daily life.

Each aquatic species plays a different role to help us make every day easier, healthier, and also more productive. They also help with the atmospheric pressure and global climate change.

See also 

 Aquatic
 Aquatic ecosystem
 Aquatic locomotion
 Aquatic mammal
 Aquatic plant
 Freshwater snail
 Marine biology
 Marine invertebrates
 Marine mammal
 Terrestrial animal
 Terrestrial ecosystem
 Terrestrial locomotion
 Terrestrial plant
 
 Wetland indicator status
 Zoology

References

 
Animals by adaptation